Russian Roulette is a 1975 British-Canadian thriller film directed by Lou Lombardo and starring George Segal, Cristina Raines and Denholm Elliott.

Plot
Shaver (George Segal), a disgraced former Royal Canadian Mounted Police officer, receives an offer to keep an eye on a Latvian dissident during an upcoming visit to Vancouver by a renegade Soviet Premier in exchange for eventually being reinstated to the force. However, upon accepting the assignment, he finds himself engulfed in a KGB conspiracy to kill the premier during his visit and must clear his own name.

Cast

Production
The film was the directorial debut for Lombardo, who is noted primarily as a film editor. It was adapted from Tom Ardies' novel Kosygin Is Coming. It was filmed primarily in Vancouver, where the story also took place.

Release
After being released theatrically in 1975, the film was released to home video on VHS in 1986, and on DVD by Shout! Factory in October 2013 as part of a double feature with Love and Bullets, a Charles Bronson thriller originally released in 1979.

References

External links 

1975 films
Films shot in Vancouver
Films set in Vancouver
English-language Canadian films
Cold War spy films
1975 drama films
Canadian drama films
British drama films
1970s thriller films
Canadian thriller films
British thriller films
ITC Entertainment films
Films with screenplays by Stanley Mann
1970s English-language films
1970s Canadian films
1970s British films